Le Coup de Foudre (Love at First Sight) is a 2019 Chinese streaming television series based on the novel I Don't Like This World, I Only Like You by Qiao Yi. It aired on Tencent and Youku from April 29 to June 5, 2019.

The series accumulated 100 million views within 13 hours of its premiere. It was praised for its uplifting message of youth and heartwarming storyline.

Synopsis 
Zhao Qiaoyi and Yan Mo promised that they would study abroad together after graduation. However, a family incident caused Zhao Qiaoyi and Yan Mo to break their promise. Four years later, they meet again at high school reunion.

Cast

Main

 Janice Wu as Zhao Qiaoyi
 A kind-hearted and optimistic girl who suffered from low self-esteem when she was young. Her dream was to be a television program producer, but she quit her job to become a marketing assistant at Panda for Yan Mo.
 Zhang Yujian as Yan Mo
 A quiet and reticent person who leads a strict regime and excels in his studies. He appears cold but cares for the people around him. He later becomes a product designer and opens up a company called Panda with Dachuan.
 Zhao Zhiwei as Zhao Guanchao
 Qiaoyi's twin brother. A doctor. A humorous and easygoing person who loved to date around. He doesn't believe in marriage until he falls in love with Wuyi.
 Ma Li as Hao Wuyi
 Qiaoyi's best friend. A novel writer. A tomboy-ish girl who is forthright and easygoing. She loves Guanchao.

Supporting

Nanchuan secondary

 An Ge as Fei Dachuan
 Yan Mo's "uncle". He appears tough and scary but is kind at heart, though brash at times. He falls in love with Youmei after realizing she is the girl who stood up for him in his childhood.
 Jampa Tseten as Teacher Gao
 Former teacher of the class who cares deeply for his students.
 Zhang Keying as Yu Miaomiao
 A haughty girl who is into fortune-telling.
 Jin Xinhe as Zhang Qihang
 Chairperson of the class.
 Liu Xuan as Da Shi
 An awkward guy who doesn't wash his hair, and like to confess to his female classmates and recite poems.
 Yang Zhiying as Wang Yuran
 The most beautiful girl in the school, who is misunderstood due to her beauty and cold personality.
 Zhao Ruyi as Shen Zhenqi
 A guy who likes Wang Yuran, but turned nasty when she rejected him.
 Zhang Zhehao as Da Xiong
 A third-year senior who plays with Wuyi's feelings. Wuyi's ex-boyfriend.
 Liu Renhou as Principal

Others

 Zhang Yue Ying as Cheng Youmei
 A wealthy girl who is spoilt but kind at heart. Yan Mo's childhood friend who had a crush on him, but later falls for Dachuan.
 Yang Chao Ran as Tian Weimin
 Qiaoyi and Guanchao's step-father. A policeman who later becomes disabled.
 Yan Qing Shu as Zhao Suying
 Qiaoyi and Guanchao's mother.
 Guo Qiu Cheng as Yan Mo's father.
 Cao Yan Yan as Lin Shu
 Yan Mo's mother. A ballerina.
 Xie Yutong as Ding Shengnan
 Wuyi's mother.
 Zhao Ke Di as Zhou Zhao
 Yan Mo's friend who likes Wuyi.
 Liang Chao as Wang Wei
 Employee of Panda
 Fan Meng as Vivian
 Employee of Panda
 Hu Wen as Zhang Taili
 Employee of Panda

 Liu Yi Ning as Lili
 Employee of Panda
 Yang Tian Qi as Cheng Ye
 Cheng Youmei's brother and Panda's business rival
 Lu Yong as CEO Cheng
 Cheng Youmei's and Cheng Ye's father
 Ye Xin Yu as Chief Fei
 Police chief. Dachuan's father.
 Gu Hong as Zhao Lei
 Qiaoyi and Guanchao's birth father.
 Ma Shu Liang as Lao Hu
 Qiaoyi's superior.
 Li Chang as Yuan Shuai
 Qiaoyi's colleague.
 Wang Genghao as Eric
 Yan Mo's stepfather.
 Li Zhen Ping as Li Huanzhang
 Dong Mei as Weiwei
 Qiaoyi's housemate

Production
The drama began filming on March 29, 2018 at Hangzhou. It wrapped up filming on July 2, 2018 at Serbia.

Reception
Le Coup De Foundre was met with positive reviews from critics. Hotpot.tv ranked the show #1 on their Top Nine Romantic Dramas of 2019 list.

Soundtrack

Awards and nominations

International broadcast

References

External links 
 

2019 Chinese television series debuts
2019 Chinese television series endings
Chinese romantic comedy television series
Television shows based on Chinese novels
Tencent original programming
Youku original programming
Chinese web series
2019 web series debuts
Television series by Tencent Penguin Pictures
Television series by Huace Media